The June 2020 Rocky Mountains-Northern Plains derecho was a rare derecho that moved across at least 750 miles and affected eight US states on June 6, 2020. The derecho was notable for forming in a highly unusual location west of the Rocky Mountains and crossing the Continental Divide. The storm which crossed the entire state of Colorado was the first storm to impact the state on record and only the third reported in the Western United States.

Meteorological History 

On the morning of June 6 a large trough of low pressure off the West Coast of the United States caused jet stream winds to move from the southwest to the northeast across the Rocky Mountains. A shortwave trough embedded in the southwest flow moved across the Rocky Mountains creating a highly unstable atmosphere and wind gusts between 59 and 71 mph across the state. This caused the Storm Prediction Center to issue slight and enhanced risks of severe weather across much of the North Central United States. At around 9 AM local time a cluster of thunderstorms developed over southeast Utah. Guided by the trough these storms moved northeast and crossed the Continental Divide at around noon. The Rocky Mountains generally disrupt thunderstorm systems but this system was too powerful. The National Weather Service in Boulder issued the largest severe thunderstorm warning it has ever issued covering an area of over 20,000 square miles. The storm moved into South Dakota by six in the evening and dissipated in eastern North Dakota by midnight the next day.

Impact 
The derecho caused widespread strong wind gusts. The strongest gust was reported near Winter Park, Colorado of 110 mph. A station at Denver International Airport reported a peak wind gust of 78 mph. Widespread wind speeds of 60 to 75 mph were observed throughout the Greater Denver area. In Colorado a total of 91 severe wind reports were recorded on June 6 2020 the most reports on record for a single day. In South Dakota, the derecho caused at least two tornadoes and widespread reports of wind gusts over 58 mph. A wind gust of 94 mph reported at Butte, South Dakota. Sections of I-94 were closed when high winds toppled vehicles and caused damage at construction sites. The strong winds uprooted and snapped numerous trees throughout the affected region causing hundreds of thousands of people to lose power including over 200,000 in Colorado. Falling trees damaged homes and vehicles and one Denver resident was injured. A Denver billboard was toppled crushing several cars and windows were shattered in Littleton.

See also 
 List of derecho events
 Tornadoes of 2020
 Weather of 2020
 June 2020 Pennsylvania-New Jersey Derecho—a derecho that hit the eastern United States three days earlier

References 

Derechos in the United States